Uttar Haryana Bijli Vitran Nigam (UHBVN) is the power company responsible for power distribution in North Haryana. UHBVH is owned by Government of Haryana, and began operations in July 1999. Its headquarters is in Panchkula adjoining Chandigarh. This company is headed by the Chief Minister of Haryana. It has two Operation Zones namely Panchkula and Rohtak. Each zone is headed by a Chief Engineer. Both Zones have five circles each; Ambala, Yamuna Nagar, Kurukshetra, Karnal and, Kaithal in Panchkula Zone and Panipat, Sonipat, Jind, Rohtak and Jhajjar in Rohtak Zone.
Each circle is headed by a Superintending Engineer.

See also 
 Divisions of Haryana

References

External links
 
 Rohtak Circle webpage
 HarSamadhan Haryana Govt's online Complaints portal 

Electric power distribution network operators in India
Energy in Haryana
State electricity agencies of India
State agencies of Haryana
1999 establishments in Haryana
Indian companies established in 1999
Energy companies established in 1999